Declan Harvey is a journalist and presenter with BBC News. He anchors the BBC's flagship nightly television news programme in Northern Ireland, BBC Newsline, and the daily radio drive time news programme, Evening Extra, on BBC Radio Ulster.

Early life 
Declan was born and grew up in Letterkenny, County Donegal, in the north-west of Ulster. He attended Scoil Colmcille and St Eunan's College. He moved to England to attend drama school aged 19.

Early career 
Declan is a classically trained actor and holds a first-class honours degree in acting from Rose Bruford College. He worked for several years as a professional actor on stage and television, and voice-over artist. He holds an MA in Theatre Practices, specialising in voice. He has worked as a professional voice and communications coach.

Journalism career 
Declan qualified from the London College of Communication as a broadcast journalist in 2010. During his training he volunteered at OnFM 101.4, a community radio station based in Hammersmith, where he presented a weekend magazine programme, LiveWires, with Storm Huntley.

Global Radio
Declan joined the Global radio group in 2010 as a reporter working across LBC, Classic FM, Capital FM and Heart. He was also a relief presenter on the rolling news station LBC News.

Declan became the full-time reporter for the award-winning Nick Ferrari at Breakfast programme. During his time at Global, Declan was the lead correspondent covering the July 7th London Bombings Inquests, the preparations for the London 2012 Olympics and the Stephen Lawrence murder trial.

Declan was a contributor to Dale&Co, the political column website by Iain Dale.

BBC Radio 1
In 2012 he joined Newsbeat on BBC Radio 1, later becoming a political reporter covering two UK general elections, the 2016 US presidential election and the Brexit referendum.

BBC World Service
In 2017, Declan became a frequent relief presenter on Newsday for the BBC World Service. He fronted BBC Minute for a short time.

BBC Northern Ireland
Declan relocated to Northern Ireland in 2017, becoming a news reporter for BBC News NI across radio and television. In 2020 it was announced Declan would become the full-time presenter of Evening Extra, alongside Tara Mills. The two would later be joined by Richard Morgan on a full-time basis.

Throughout 2021, Declan co-created and co-hosted the BBC podcast Year '21, a 'week-by-week' telling of how Northern Ireland was created, exactly 100 years previous. The podcast received critical acclaim and a number of international awards and nominations.

In December 2021, the BBC announced Declan would become a main anchor of the flagship television news programme, BBC Newsline. He rotates his presenting duties between TV and radio.

Personal life 
Declan lives with his partner, Ciarán, in Belfast.

Awards and nominations

References

Living people
BBC newsreaders and journalists
Year of birth missing (living people)